Petre Dicu (born 27 May 1954) is a retired light-heavyweight Greco-Roman wrestler from Romania. He competed at the 1976 and 1980 Olympics and won a bronze medal in 1980. He won two more bronze medals at European championships in 1978 and 1979 and a silver medal at the 1977 World Championships.

References

1954 births
Living people
Olympic wrestlers of Romania
Wrestlers at the 1976 Summer Olympics
Wrestlers at the 1980 Summer Olympics
Romanian male sport wrestlers
Olympic bronze medalists for Romania
Olympic medalists in wrestling
Medalists at the 1980 Summer Olympics
European Wrestling Championships medalists
World Wrestling Championships medalists